The Sulaimankhel, or Suleiman Khel, are a Pashtun sub-tribe of the Ghilji  tribe of Bettani confederation of Pashtuns, Mostly Nomadic People.  In the early 20th century, the tribe was recognised as generally pastoral.

History

In 1924, the Sulaimankhel joined in the Khost Rebellion initiated by the Mangal tribe.
Population of this tribe primarily lies in Afghanistan. Alikhel, Umer Khel are brother tribes of the SulemanKhel tribe. According to Gulab Mangal, former governor of Paktika Province, the Sulaimankhel provided the majority of recruits for the Taliban in the province.  As a result, the level of Anti-Coalition Militia activities remain high in areas dominated by Sulemankhel. The bias of some sub-tribes toward the Taliban in part may be explained by their proximity to the Pakistan border and the influx of insurgents and the radical politics. Umer khel is also one of the well known Tribe member in Pakistan along with a minority of other members,  They have been allied with the Hotaki in the past, and their traditional rivals include the Kharoti.  Principal sub-divisions of the Sulemankhel include the (Sultan khel) (Khazarkhel), (NazarKhel), (Alizai), (Dustukhel),(Sulemanzai), (Ahmadzai), and (Jalalzai), (QasarKhel),  Other sub-divisions include the (Alikhel), the (Nizamkhel), the (Dinnarkhel), and the Shakhel, which primarily lives in the northwest of Paktika, has been more cooperative with the central government and coalition forces.  The Nizamkhel and Shakhel also remain more supportive of the government, which may be explained in part by their rivalry with the Jalalzai.
The Sulaimankhel also have a strong presence in Swat, Haripur, Abbottabad, Mansehra, Quetta, Gwadar, Peshawar, Ghazni, Zabul, Paktia, Khost, Logar, Wardak, Kabul, Nangarhar and  Helmand. Haji Maula Nazar Dustukhel is the current chief of Sulaimankhel Kochi tribes in Afghanistan and Pakistan. There is also a large presence of Sulemankhel Kochi tribes in Kunduz, Nangarhar, Kabul, Peshawar, Attock, Haripur, Quetta, Kandahar, Maidan, Helmand  Lahore Karachi and  Herat.

Cuisine
Meat is the common part of their diet which they usually have it with sharwa, which is soup. It's a rich and hearty soup made with meat and potatoes. They generally serve the sharwa in a large communal bowl.  Everyone rips their nan into small piece, throws it into the shorwa and enjoys the soup using their hand.

Culture
All of the Sub tribes of Sulemankhel are known for their strict following of Pakhtunwali.  Most prominent Sulemankhel Ssub-tribes strictly follow its practice of Pashtunwali and are known for dispute resolution. Dustukhel's laid the foundation and brought amendments in the system to be upto date according to the new era. It's a pre-Islamic tradition, also known for being the strongest tribesmen, dating back to Alexander's defeat of the Persian Empire in 330 BC, possibly survived in the form of traditional dances, while literary styles and music. Sulaimankhel tribe follows the principles of Pushtunwali tradition rigidly. Tribe have frequent blood feuds. Most of the population still lacks proper education which results in a high illiteracy.

Famous People
Azad Khan Afghan Military Commander.

Nur Muhammad Taraki Former President of Afghanistan.

Mohammad Najibullah Former President of Afghanistan.

Ashraf Ghani Former President of Afghanistan.

Haji Maula Nazar Dustukhel is the current chief of Sulaimankhel Kochi tribes in Afghanistan and Pakistan.

Mohammad Nabi Esakhel Afghanistan National Cricket Team Captain

Mullah Omar Mujahid Islamic Emirate of Afghanistan Supreme Leader

Abdul Qadeer was the Vice-President of Afghanistan and the Governor of Nangarhar Province.

Abdul Haq  Afghan mujahideen commander.

Mohammad Yaqoob Mujahid Afghan Defense Minister.

References

Ghilji Pashtun tribes
Ethnic groups in Paktika Province